John Quoc Duong was born in 1973, in Saigon, South Vietnam. He immigrated to the United States in 1982. Duong received his bachelor's degree from U.C. Davis and his Executive MBA from U.C. Irvine. Appointed by President George W. Bush, Duong served from 2001 to 2003 as the Director of the White House Initiative on Asian Americans and Pacific Islanders (AAPIs) and concurrently as Executive Director of The President's Advisory Commission on Asian Americans and Pacific Islanders. The White House Initiative on AAPIs & the President's Advisory Commission on AAPIs advise the President on the needs and concerns of the Asian Americans and Pacific Islanders' population. Duong was an aide for then California Governor Pete Wilson, from 1996 to 1999.

Currently, Duong is a consultant executive at Bridgecreek, a real estate development company based in Orange County, California. In 2006, he was the candidate backed by the Republican Party of Orange County to break the Democratic control of the Irvine City Council. Duong directly challenged incumbent Mayor Beth Krom, but was defeated in his first bid for elected office.  Duong currently serves as a member of the City of Irvine Planning Commission.

See also
 Eric Holder

External links
Duong Will Head White House Initiative on Asian Americans and Pacific Islanders
John Quoc Duong listed in Who's Who of Asian Americans
John Quoc Duong Biographic Sketch by the Institute for Corean-American Studies  
John Quoc Duong
John Quoc Duong Biography

1973 births
Vietnamese emigrants to the United States
Living people
People from Ho Chi Minh City
California local politicians
University of California, Davis alumni
California politicians of Vietnamese descent
Asian conservatism in the United States